János Sarusi Kis (born 29 June 1960) is a Hungarian sprint canoeist who competed in the 1980s. He won six medals at the ICF Canoe Sprint World Championships with four golds (C-2 500 m: 1985, 1986; C-2 1000 m: 1982, 1986), one silver (C-1 500 m: 1982), and one bronze (C-1 500 m: 1981).

Sarusi Kis also finished sixth in the C-2 500 m event at the 1988 Summer Olympics in Seoul

References

1960 births
Canoeists at the 1988 Summer Olympics
Hungarian male canoeists
Living people
Olympic canoeists of Hungary
ICF Canoe Sprint World Championships medalists in Canadian
20th-century Hungarian people